Sumble, Sumbli or Sumblus was a legendary king of the Finns during the 1st century. According to Gesta Danorum, Gram, the king of the Danes invaded his realm, but halted after noticing Sumble's daughter, Signe and proposed to her. This enraged Gram's brother-in-law, the king of Norwegians, thus Gram was forced to leave Finland in order to defeat him. However, while he was away, Sumble arranged a marriage between Signe and Henry, the king of the Saxons. Nonetheless, this plan was foiled when Gram murdered Henry during the wedding feast for Signe had informed him.

The text

References

Legendary Danish people
Fictional Finnish people
Kings in Norse mythology and legends